Berlin Nobody is an upcoming film written and directed by Jordan Scott, and starring Eric Bana, Sadie Sink and Sylvia Hoeks. It is an adaptation of Nicholas Hogg's 2015 novel Tokyo.

Cast

Eric Bana as Ben Monroe
Sylvia Hoeks as Nina
Sadie Sink as Mazzy
Jonas Dassler
Sophie Rois

Production
Filming began in Berlin in September 2022. A co-production of the United States and Germany. It has production by Ridley Scott and Michael Pruss for Scott Free Productions in conjunction with Augenschein FilmProduktion's Jonas Katzenstein, Maximilian Leo, and Georgina Pope. It is executive-produced by Augenschein's Jonathan Saubach with Rebecca Feuer executive producing for Scott Free. Actress Kiernan Shipka was initially added to the production in January 2022 alongside Bana, but left the project before principal photography began in September 2022. In May, 2022 Sylvia Hoeks was added to the cast. In September 2022 Sadie Sink, Jonas Dassler and Sophie Rois were added to the cast. Filming wrapped by December 2022.

Release
Protagonist Pictures and Augenschein Sales have control of worldwide sales jointly.

References 

Upcoming films
American drama films
2020s English-language films
2020s American films
Scott Free Productions films